The Berman Jewish DataBank, founded as the North American Jewish Data Bank, is the central online source for social scientific studies of North American Jewry and world Jewish populations and communities. The DataBank's primary functions are to acquire and archive materials from quantitative studies of North American Jews, including data sets and reports, and to encourage and aid the production and utilization of quantitative research on North American Jews.

The DataBank maintains partnerships with the Berman Jewish Policy Archive and the University of Connecticut’s Center for Judaic Studies and Contemporary Jewish Life.

The DataBank holds more than 375 surveys and studies of North American Jews, including more than 200 local community studies usually commissioned by local Jewish federations.

Funding for the DataBank comes from an endowment provided by the Mandell and Madeleine Berman Foundation and from The Jewish Federations of North America (JFNA), and management is provided by JFNA. The DataBank's professional staff includes Laurence Kotler-Berkowtiz, Director of the Berman Jewish DataBank; Ron Miller, Senior Research Consultant at the  Berman Jewish DataBank; and Arnold Dashefsky, Director Emeritus and Senior Academic Consultant of the Berman Jewish DataBank.

The Berman Jewish DataBank was founded as the North American Jewish Data Bank in 1986 and operated under that name until July 2013. Funded throughout that time by the Berman Foundation under an arrangement with the Jewish Federation system, the North American Jewish Data Bank was located at the City University of New York from 1986 until 2002, at Brandeis University (2003–04) and the University of Connecticut (2004-2013) before moving to JFNA and changing names as of July 2013.

See also
Arnold Dashefsky, Director Emeritus
Ron Miller, Senior Research Consultant
Mandell L. Berman, founder of the Mandell L. and Madeleine H. Berman Foundation
The Jewish Federations of North America

Notes

External links

http://www.bjpa.org/
https://web.archive.org/web/20130921185835/http://judaicstudies.uconn.edu/research.html
https://web.archive.org/web/20150420011832/http://databib.org/repository/343
https://web.archive.org/web/20150907210804/https://www.lib.umn.edu/indexes/moreinfo?id=13726
https://web.archive.org/web/20130702162135/https://libraries.ucsd.edu/info/resources/north-american-jewish-data-bank
http://www.nypl.org/collections/articles-databases/north-american-jewish-data-bank
http://bcldatabases.blogspot.com/2010/09/home-north-american-jewish-data-bank.html

Jewish society
Demographics of North America
University of Connecticut
Online archives of the United States
Jews and Judaism in the United States
Social sciences literature
Sociology of religion